Trichophysetis acutangulalis is a moth in the family Crambidae. It is found in India.

References

Cybalomiinae
Moths described in 1903
Moths of Asia